The Vertical Launch - Short Range Surface to Air Missile, or VL-SRSAM is a quick reaction surface-to-air missile developed by the Defence Research and Development Organisation (DRDO). During mid-course flight, the missile uses fibre-optic gyroscope based inertial guidance mechanism while in terminal phase uses active radar homing. With lock on before launch (LOBL) and lock on after launch (LOAL) capability, the missile receives mid-course update via datalink. VL-SRSAM intended to replace older Barak 1 surface to air missile system onboard Indian Navy warships. It will also be used as short range air defence system for Indian Air Force.

Design

VL-SRSAM is based on Astra Mark 1 air-to-air missile with four short-span long-chord cruciform wings that provide aerodynamic stability. It also includes additional jet vane driven thrust vector control to enable quick reaction time on vertical launch and smokeless exhaust. VL-SRSAM conceived for area and point-defence role to save naval platforms. Each Vertical Launch System (VLS) can hold forty missiles in a twin quad-pack canister configuration carrying eight missiles each for hot launch that can be installed in an arrangement of multiple launch systems based on availability of space on the ship. The missile is for neutralizing various aerial threats at medium and close ranges, including fighter aircraft and sea skimming anti-ship missiles. As an integrated solution of missile and weapon control system (WCS) with 360° interception capability, it can detect and engage threats from different directions. Although plan was to develop short range air defence missile, VL-SRSAM achieved a range of 50 km making it a medium range air defence system. The missile is said to be fitted in destroyers, frigates, corvettes and aircraft carriers.

Defence Research and Development Laboratory (DRDL), Research & Development Establishment (Engineers), Research Centre Imarat (RCI) and some private sector industries were involved in the design and development of the missile system as part of Development cum Production Partner programme (DCPP). VL-SRSAM superseded the cancelled Maitri missile project undertaken jointly by MBDA and DRDO based on the work done on MICA and Trishul.

Testing

First test

DRDO successfully test fired two VL-SRSAM on 22 February 2021 at Odisha coast. The maiden launch tested the efficacy of vertical launch system and missile's maximum and minimum range. Both the missile successfully intercepted their target with pin point accuracy.

Second test

VL-SRSAM was successfully tested  by DRDO from Integrated Test Range, Chandipur, off the coast of Odisha on 7 December 2021. The launch was conducted from a vertical launcher against an electronic target at a very low altitude. The launch was conducted to validate integrated operation of all weapon system components including the vertical launcher unit with controller, canisterised flight vehicle, weapon control system etc.

Third test

Defence Research and Development Organisation (DRDO) on 24 June 2022 announced that India has successfully test-fired the Vertically Launched Short Range Surface to Air Missile (VL-SRSAM) from an Indian Naval Ship off the coast of Chandipur in Odisha. The launch of the system was conducted against a high-speed aerial target mimicking aircraft, which was successfully engaged. 

Fourth test 

DRDO and Indian Navy successfully flight tested VL-SRSAM from the ITR,Chandipur off the coast of Odisha on 23 August 2022.The flight test was carried out from an Indian Naval Ship against a high-speed unmanned aerial target for demonstration of vertical launch capability. The missiles, equipped with indigenous Radio Frequency (RF) seeker, intercepted the target with high accuracy.

Operators

 Indian Navy- Rajput-class destroyer

See also 

Trishul
Maitri
XR-SAM
Barak 8
Akash-NG
Akash
Advanced Air Defence (AAD)
Prithvi Air Defence (PAD)
QRSAM

References

Defence Research and Development Organisation
Surface-to-air missiles of India
Post–Cold War weapons of India
Guided missiles of India
Naval surface-to-air missiles